The 2012 Italian Open (also known as the 2012 Rome Masters and sponsored title 2012 Internazionali BNL d'Italia) was a tennis tournament, being played on outdoor clay courts at the Foro Italico in Rome, Italy. It was the 69th edition of the Italian Open and was classified as an ATP World Tour Masters 1000 event on the 2012 ATP World Tour and a Premier 5 event on the 2012 WTA Tour. It took place from 14 to 21 May 2012, because rain delayed the Men's final to Monday.

Points and prize money

Point distribution

Prize money

ATP singles main draw entrants

Seeds

 Rankings are as of 15 May 2012

Other entrants
The following players received wildcards into the main draw:
  Fabio Fognini
  Paolo Lorenzi
  Potito Starace
  Filippo Volandri

The following players received entry from the qualifying draw:
  Guillermo García-López
  Santiago Giraldo 
  Robin Haase
  Blaž Kavčič
  Sam Querrey
  Albert Ramos
  Adrian Ungur

Withdrawals
  Mardy Fish
  Kei Nishikori (stomach injury)
  Robin Söderling (mononucleosis)

Retirements
  Alexandr Dolgopolov

ATP doubles main draw entrants

Seeds

 Rankings are as of 15 May 2012

Other entrants
The following pairs received wildcards into the doubles main draw:
  Flavio Cipolla /  Paolo Lorenzi
  Gianluca Naso /  Filippo Volandri

Retirements
  Pablo Andújar

WTA singles main draw entrants

Seeds

 Rankings are as of 7 May 2012

Other entrants
The following players received wildcards into the main draw:
  Alberta Brianti
  Karin Knapp
  Venus Williams

The following players received entry from the qualifying draw:
  Anna Chakvetadze
  Olga Govortsova
  Andrea Hlaváčková
  Mirjana Lučić
  Anastasia Rodionova
  Silvia Soler Espinosa
  Sloane Stephens
  Aleksandra Wozniak

Withdrawals
  Mona Barthel
  Daniela Hantuchová (foot injury)
  Kaia Kanepi (foot injury)
  Andrea Petkovic (ankle injury)
  Vera Zvonareva

WTA doubles main draw entrants

Seeds

1 Rankings are as of 7 May 2012

Other entrants
The following pairs received wildcards into the doubles main draw:
  Nastassja Burnett /  Alexa Virgili
  Maria Elena Camerin /  Karin Knapp
The following pair received entry as alternates:
  Jill Craybas /  Sloane Stephens

Withdrawals
  Andrea Hlaváčková (right thigh injury)

Retirements
  Janette Husárová (low back injury)
  Flavia Pennetta (right wrist injury)
  Peng Shuai (left hand injury)

Finals

Men's singles

 Rafael Nadal defeated  Novak Djokovic, 7–5, 6–3

Women's singles

 Maria Sharapova defeated  Li Na, 4–6, 6–4, 7–6(7–5)

Men's doubles

 Marcel Granollers /  Marc López defeated  Łukasz Kubot /  Janko Tipsarević, 6–3, 6–2

Women's doubles

 Sara Errani /  Roberta Vinci defeated  Ekaterina Makarova /  Elena Vesnina, 6–2, 7–5

References

External links
Official website

 
Italian Open
Italian Open
Italian Open (Tennis)
2012 Italian Open (Tennis)
Tennis